Association Control Service Element (ACSE) is the OSI method for establishing a call between one application programs. ACSE checks the identities and contexts of the application entities, and could apply an authentication security check.

References
 ITU Rec. X.227 (ISO 8650), X.217 (ISO 8649) 

OSI protocols